Tillandsia guatemalensis is a species of flowering plant in the genus Tillandsia. This species is native to Mexico and Central America.

References

guatemalensis
Flora of Mexico
Flora of Central America
Plants described in 1949